, provisionally known as 2001 XH255,  is a trans-Neptunian object (TNO) that has a 4:5 resonance with Neptune.

It will come to perihelion in 2041.

Assuming a generic TNO albedo of 0.09, it is about 100 km in diameter.

Resonance
According to the Deep Ecliptic Survey and Minor Planet Center,  has a 4:5 resonance with Neptune.  It comes as close as 32.2 AU from the Sun and has a fairly low orbital eccentricity of 0.07 with an inclination of only 2.86 degrees.

The Neptune 4:5 resonance keeps it more than 7 AU from Neptune over a 14000-year period.

It has been observed 21 times over 5 oppositions and has an orbit quality code of 3.

Potential for Exploration 
A NASA study in 2019 that confirmed the viability of using small radioisotope or nuclear fission power systems combined with xenon electric propulsion for deep space exploration, used 2001 XH255 as a representative Kuiper Belt Object as the mission's destination to orbit.

References

External links 
 

131697
Discoveries by Jan Kleyna
Discoveries by Scott S. Sheppard
Discoveries by David C. Jewitt
20011211